John Chynoweth Burnham (July 14, 1929 – May 12, 2017) was an American historian who was a professor of history at Ohio State University from 1963 to 2002. He was an expert on the history of science, medicine, psychology, and psychiatry. He served as president of the American Association for the History of Medicine from 1990 to 1992, and as editor-in-chief of the Journal of the History of the Behavioral Sciences from 1997 to 2000. He was a fellow of the American Psychological Association and the American Association for the Advancement of Science. He also received the Lifetime Achievement Award from Division 26 of the American Psychological Association.

References

1929 births
2017 deaths
20th-century American historians
20th-century American male writers
Ohio State University faculty
Writers from Boulder, Colorado
Stanford University alumni
University of Wisconsin–Madison alumni
Historians of science
Historians of psychology
Fellows of the American Psychological Association
Fellows of the American Association for the Advancement of Science
Academic journal editors
American male non-fiction writers